Parashmoni is a 1988 Bengali film directed by Tarun Majumder. It was his second movie in 1988 starring Tapas Paul, Satabdi Roy and Santu Mukhopadhyay on the lead.

References

External links

Bengali-language Indian films
Films directed by Tarun Majumdar
1988 films
1980s Bengali-language films